Sea Panther-class large command boats are vessels built for and used by the Hong Kong Police Force for marine patrols off Hong Kong. Commissioned in 1988, two boats were built:

 PL3 Sea Panther
 PL4 Sea Horse

References

Patrol vessels of the People's Republic of China
Hong Kong Police Force